This is an incomplete list of Kurdish uprisings. You can help by expanding it.

List of conflicts

References